Uzeyir bey Abdulhuseyn oghlu Hajibeyov (September 18, 1885November 23, 1948), known as Uzeyir Hajibeyov (Arabic script:) was an Azerbaijani composer, conductor, publicist, playwright, and social figure. He is recognized as the father of Azerbaijani composed classical music and opera. Uzeyir Hajibeyov composed the music of the national anthem of Azerbaijan Democratic Republic (which was re-adopted after Azerbaijan regained its independence from the Soviet Union in 1991). He also composed the anthem used by Azerbaijan during the Soviet period. He was the first composer of an opera in the Islamic world. He composed that first oriental opera Leyli and Majnun in 1908 and since then Azerbaijani people have been honored him for bringing to life the written masterpiece of the world literature.

Early life
Uzeyir Hajibeyov was born in Aghjabadi in the Elisabethpol Governorate of the Russian Empire, which is now part of Azerbaijan. His father, Abdul Huseyn Hajibeyov, was the secretary to Khurshidbanu Natavan for many years, and his mother, Shirin, grew up in the Natavan household. Growing up, Hajibeyov was strongly influenced by Natavan's work.

Shusha, often dubbed as the cradle of Azerbaijani music and culture, had a reputation for its musical heritage. The town was also referred to as "the Music Conservatory of the Caucasus" because of its many talented musicians and singers. And the fact that Hajibeyov grew up in Shusha explains how at 22, in 1908, with very little formal musical education, he was capable of writing a full-length opera.

Hajibeyov received his early education in a religious school (madrasah), where he perfected his Arabic and Persian. Later he studied at a two-year Russian-Azerbaijani school. Here, with the help of his favourite teacher Mirza Mehdi Hasanzadeh, he familiarized himself with the heritage of the famous classic writers of the East and the West. The richness of the musical performance tradition of Shusha greatly influenced the musical education of Uzeyir Hajibeyov. He would later reflect on his experiences: "The first musical education I got as a child in Shusha came from best singers and saz-players. At that time I sang mughams and tasnifs. The singers liked my voice. They would make me sing and teach me at the same time." Uzeyir Hajibeyov's first teacher was his uncle Agalar Aliverdibeyov, an excellent connoisseur of Azeri folk music. In 1897–1898, when Azerbaijani playwright Abdurrahim Hagverdiyev and singer Jabbar Garyagdyoglu staged the episode Majnun on Leyli's grave from Leyli and Majnun, 13-year-old Uzeyir sang in the choir.
From 1899 to 1904 Uzeyir Hajibeyov studied at the Gori Pedagogical Seminary. There, along with general education, he also acquired music. In this school Hajibeyov learned to play the violin, the violoncello and the brass instrument. After his graduation from the Pedagogical Seminary, Uzeyir Hajibeyov was appointed a teacher to the village of Hadrut in Upper Karabakh. Having worked there for a year, Hajibeyov permanently settled in Baku, where he carried on his career in teaching mathematics, geography, history, Azeri and Russian languages, and music. He wrote the Turkic-Russian and Russian-Turkic Dictionary of Political, Legal, Economic and Military Terms, Used in Press in 1907 and the textbook Arithmetic Problems in 1908, and had them published by the Orujov Brothers Publishing House in Baku.

Hajibeyov was no stranger to the tragic chaos of war; he lived through the Revolutions of 1905 and 1917, the fall of the Democratic Republic of Azerbaijan in 1920, and both World Wars. The political repercussions of these military conquests often manifested in other forms of chaos. For example, between 1920 and 1940, the alphabet systems for writing Azeri were changed three times — from Arabic to Latin, and from Latin to Cyrillic — a process which greatly hindered and interrupted the educational and cultural process and may well have been one of the factors influencing Uzeyir Hajibeyov to present his ideas verbally on the musical stage.

Merging traditional and Western styles

Throughout all the tumultuous change in Azerbaijan that took place between 1900 and 1940, one characteristic consistently reflects the character of Uzeyir Hajibeyov. He always searched for ways to merge and integrate the past with the present rather than to discard either form. Rather curiously, even files at the Gori Pedagogical Seminary have shown his persistence in holding on to his own roots even under pressure. On December 3, 1900, when he was 15, it is noted that "the student, Uzeyir Hajibeyov, was rebuked because he was talking in his native language." Conversely, when Russian-influenced musicians tried to ban traditional Azerbaijani instruments like the tar, zurna and kamancha, Hajibeyov and his colleagues pushed to incorporate them into the Western orchestra, thereby, giving them an even higher status and ultimately a chance to survive. The great composer Ü.Hacıbeyli had the opportunity to open music schools that combined various educational systems. In these schools, national cadres who could integrate into the world music culture were trained. History and music theory of Azerbaijani music were researched and education classes were written.  Uzeyir Hajibeyli  in the field of music education combined and created in Azerbaijan Western and East traditions.

Musical contributions

In 1908, Hajibeyov wrote his first opera, Leyli and Majnun, based on the tragic love story by the 15th century poet Fuzûlî. This would be the first of 7 operas and 3 musical comedies that Hajibeyov would compose throughout his life. In Leyli and Majnun, the uniqueness of the traditional modal music of mugham was incorporated into a Western genre with the use of instruments indigenous to both traditions.

Hajibeyov's second opera Sheikh Sanan was written in 1909 in a form that was entirely opposite to the first. This time Hajibeyov employed a purely European style. Sheikh Sanan received raves as a musical composition, but the content was too progressive for the period. In this opera, Hajibeyov advocated that marriage should not be bound by nationality or religion - in essence, it was another form of integration. But this time, it backfired. The story line follows a religious sheikh on his way to Mecca who meets a very beautiful Georgian lady. To his horror, the lovely creature's father turns out to be a swineherd, caring for what, to him, was a forbidden animal. In the end, the sheikh denounces his religion to win the woman. It is said that when the opera was performed, many people were offended and walked out, leaving Hajibeyov with the realization that he had outpaced his generation too much this time. As a result, he made a drastic decision and burned the score. When asked by Ramazan Khalilov, his assistant, how he could do that, Hajibeyov replied: "I didn't destroy my opera. It's my own creation so it's always in my head." Khalilov said that Hajibeyov went on to use this same magnificent music 27 years later to create Koroğlu, an opera that many acclaim to be his finest.

In contrast to Sheikh Sanan, Hajibeyov's operas Rustam and Sohrab (1910), Asli and Karam (1912), Shah Abbas and Khurshid Banu (1912), and Harun and Leyli (1915) were entirely based on Azeri folk music elements, primarily mugham.

In October 2006, the musical comedy Arshin Mal Alan ("The Cloth Peddler") by Uzeyir Hajibeyov, written in 1913, was announced to be performed on western stages for the first time.

One of Hajibeyov's greatest legacies was bringing forward the idea of establishing a professional music school. Hence the Baku Academy of Music (known then as the Azerbaijan State Conservatoire), was founded in 1920 and named after Hajibeyov after his death. The school has trained Azerbaijan's finest composers such as Gara Garayev, Fikrat Amirov, Jovdat Hajiyev, Soltan Hajibeyov, Tofig Guliyev, and Vagif Mustafazade. His statue "sits" in front of this grand building that is still devoted to the synthesizing Eastern and Western musical traditions.

In 1931, Hajibeyov helped in establishing the Azeri Folk Instruments Orchestra affiliated with the Radio Committee. This orchestra performed European classical pieces, such as those by Mikhail Glinka, Wolfgang Amadeus Mozart, Franz Schubert, Georges Bizet and others. Hajibeyov thus was the first musician to adapt the note system to traditional Azeri musical instruments.

In 1936, Hajibeyov assisted in founding of the Azerbaijani State Choir within the Azerbaijan Philharmonic Society. One of the most serious problems he faced was the mono-voiced repertoire of Azeri folk songs, which allowed harmonization distort style of the song and, on occasion, even alter the melody line when it changed modes. Hajibeyov resolved this problem by using contrapuntal polyphony and unison-doubling rather than four-part singing in the problematic sections.

Hajibeyov devoted much energy to the idea of integrating woman's role and status into the male-dominated world. The concept of women's emancipation runs through many of his works often in the form of comedy or satirization as in the case when he makes fun of the process of selecting marriage partners, a process hindered by the fact that women were still wearing veils until the 1920s when the Soviet regime prohibited them.

Publications

From 1919 to 1920 Hajibeyov served as editor-in-chief for the newspaper Azerbaijan, the main governmental media body of the Democratic Republic of Azerbaijan.

In 1927, Hajibeyov published Collection of Azerbaijani Folk Songs along with composer Muslim Magomayev. For the first time, more than 300 pieces of Azeri folk music were documented by notation. In 1945, he published the book entitled Principles of Azerbaijan Folk Music, which has been translated into several languages including English in 1985 devoted to the centenary of his birth.

Operas

“Leyli and Majnun” 
The opera art was established art not only in Azerbaijan, but also in the entire Muslim East by means of Hacibeyov's opera "Leyli and Majnun" which premiered on January 12, 1908, at the theatre of Haji Zeynalabdin Taghiyev. Hajibeyov wrote with his brother Jeyhun Hajibeyov this libretto of the opera based on poem of the same name written by Fuzuli.The first performance was made by actor and director Huseyn Arablinski. The band-master was the writer-dramatist Abdurrahim bey Hagverdiyev. Huseynqulu Sarabski was in the role of “Majnun” and Abdurrahim Farajov in the role of “Leyli”.In next performances, Hajibeyov himself and his close friend and colleague, composer Muslim Magomayev performed as band-master.

This role was acted for the first time by Huseyinqulu Sarablinski. Then, these people - Sidghi Ruhulla, Khanlar Hakhverdiev, Aliovsat Sadıghov, Shirzad Hüseynov, Gulagha Mammadov, Mais Salmanov, Gulu Asgarov, Bakir Hashimov, Ali Mehdiyev, Arif Babaev, Baba Mirzaev, Janali Akbarov, Safa Gahramanov, Alim Gasımov and Mansum İbrahimov performed in a role of Majnun at the next performance.

“Koroglu” 
“Koroglu opera” premiered firstly on April 30, 1937 at the Azerbaijan Opera and Ballet Theatre. This is the first classical opera that based on the motives of heroic epic in Azerbaijan.

In this opera, Hajibeyov created arias, mass choral scenes, various ensembles, ballet numbers and recitatives.

In the next years of his life, he worked on "Firuza" opera.

Musical comedies

“Husband and wife” 
The first musical comedy of Hajibeyov is “Husband and wife” which is consist of three scenes. This is the first example of Azerbaijani musical comedy. The first premiere of it was in 1910. H.Sarabski and A.Aghdamski performed in the roles of Marjan and Minnat. Hajibeyov wrote the sketch of the comedy himself.

“If Not That One, Then This One” 
After “Husband and wife” opera, he began to write the second operetta of him. The first premiere of it was at the theatre of Mailovs brothers in Baku in 1911. “Mən nə qədər qoca olsam da” song and “Uzundere” national folk music are sounded in this opera with some changes on it.

Later, this opera was translated into various languages, performed in Caucasian countries, Turkey, Bulgaria and other countries.

"Arshin Mal Alan" 
The first feature film based on “Arshin Mal Alan” Musical comedy was shot in 1916. This film was the silent film.

For the next time it was screened at "Baku movie studio" in 1945 with some changes on it. The main role of film belonged to Rashid Behbudov.

This comedy again was screened in Baku, in 1965. Director of the film was Tofiq Taghizade and Fikrat Amirov performed as a music redactor. It was translated into many languages such as English, German, Chinese, Arabic, Persian, Polish etc.

Official honours

Hajibeyov was the creator of the first operas and operettas in the Orient. In 1938, he was awarded with the title of People's Artist of the USSR. He was also honored with the Order of Lenin and the Stalin Prize which he won twice, once in 1941 for the opera Koroghlu (1936), and the other time in 1946 for the 1945 film based on his opera Arshin Mal Alan.

Hajibeyov was a professor at the Baku Academy of Music (of which he was also head in 1928–1929 and 1939–1948) and Active Member of the Academy of Sciences of Azerbaijan. For the last 10 years of his life, he was Chairman of the Union of Azerbaijani Composers.

Hajibeyov joined the Communist Party in 1938. He served twice as a deputy of the Supreme Soviet of the Soviet Union, the highest legislative institution in the Union.

Hajibeyov died of diabetes at the age of 63, and was buried at the Alley of Honor in Baku.

On September 18, 1995 the 110th anniversary of Hajibeyov's birth has been celebrated. No one in the history of modern music in Azerbaijan is recognized for having done more to lay the foundation for Azerbaijani music as it exists today, especially with its unique synthesis of Eastern and Western traditional musical instruments and musical forms.

In 2008 the National Bank of Azerbaijan minted a 100 manat gold commemorative coin dedicated to Hajibeyov's memory.

In June 2011 President of Azerbaijan Ilham Aliyev and President of Serbia Tadic unveiled a monument of Hajibeyov on the Dunavski kej in Novi Sad, Serbia.

On the occasion of the 130th birthday anniversary of the composer, Los Angeles Mayor Eric Garcetti proclaimed September 18, 2015 as the "Uzeyir Hajibeyli Memorial Day" in the City of Los Angeles and called on all residents to join this celebration. Also U.S. Congressman Paul Gosar from Arizona extended a Congressional Record recognizing Hajibeyov's achievements.

Uzeyir Music Day 
September 18 is celebrated as "Uzeyir Music Day" after national leader Heydar Aliyev's decree in 1995. Different events and celebrations are usually held on this day with participation of world-famous musicians.

Stage works
 Leyli and Majnun, opera, 1908.
 Sheikh Sanan, opera, 1909. Destroyed by the composer.
 Husband and Wife, operetta, 1910.
 O olmasın, bu olsun ("If Not That One, Then This One"). Musical comedy (operetta) in four acts, 1910
 Rustam and Zohrab, mugham opera, 1910.
 Asli and Kerem, mugham opera in four acts and six scenes, 1912.
 Shah Abbas and Khurshid Banu, mugham opera, 1912.
 Arshin Mal Alan ("The Cloth Peddler"). Musical comedy (operetta), 1913.
 Harun and Leyli, mugham opera, 1915
 Koroğlu ("The Blind Man's Son"), opera. Written 1936, premiered 1937.
 Chirpynirdi gara deniz (“The Black Sea raged”), song. Written 1918.

In popular culture
In 2013, Google celebrated Hajibeyov's 128th Birthday with Google Doodle on its Azerbaijani version.

Gallery

See also

List of People's Artists of the Azerbaijan SSR

References

External links

Web-site dedicated to Uzeyir Hajibeyov - HAJIBEYOV.com including librettos, articles by and about Hajibeyov and some audio recordings of his works
Librettos in English and Azeri Latin of most of Hajibeyov's operas and musical comedies. HAJIBEYOV.com .
Monument of Uzeyir Hajibeyov to be erected
"Soviet Music and Society Under Lenin and Stalin: The Baton and the Sickle" by Matt O'Brien in Azerbaijan International, Vol. 13:1 (Spring 2005), pp. 80–81.
"Politically Correct Music: Stalin's Era and the Struggle of Azerbaijani Composers" by Aida Huseinova, in Azerbaijan International, Vol. 14:2 (Summer 2006), pp. 56–65.
 A short section of a stage production of the opera Köroğlu, YouTube:  (10 min 55 sec). The libretto of this part of opera is in Persian.
 A short section of Hajibeyov's celebrated social satire Mashadi Ibad:  (9 min 40 sec).

1885 births
1948 deaths
People from Aghjabadi District
People from Elizavetpol Governorate
Azerbaijani communists
Azerbaijani composers
Azerbaijani conductors (music)
Azerbaijani film score composers
Azerbaijani music educators
Azerbaijani musicologists
Azerbaijani ethnomusicologists
Azerbaijani choral conductors
National anthem writers
Azerbaijani opera composers
Soviet opera composers
People's Artists of the Azerbaijan SSR
People's Artists of the USSR
Recipients of the Order of Lenin
Recipients of the Order of the Red Banner of Labour
Soviet composers
Soviet male composers
Stalin Prize winners
Soviet Azerbaijani people
Azerbaijani Muslims
Burials at Alley of Honor
19th-century Azerbaijani people
20th-century Azerbaijani people
20th-century musicologists
20th-century conductors (music)
Musicians from Shusha
20th-century male musicians
Writers from Shusha
Honored Art Workers of the Azerbaijan SSR
Transcaucasian Teachers Seminary alumni